The Great Turn or Great Break was the radical change in the economic policy of the USSR from 1928 to 1929, primarily consisting of the process by which the New Economic Policy (NEP) of 1921 was abandoned in favor of the acceleration of collectivization and industrialization and also a  cultural revolution. The term came from the title of Joseph Stalin's article "Year of the Great Turn" (literally: "Year of the Great Break: Toward the 12th Anniversary of October") published on November 7, 1929, the 12th anniversary of the October Revolution. David R. Marples argues that the era of the Great Break lasted until 1934.

Collectivization 
Up to 1928, Stalin supported the New Economic Policy implemented by his predecessor Vladimir Lenin. The NEP had brought some market reforms to the Soviet economy, including allowing peasants to sell surplus grain on the domestic and international market. However, in 1928 Stalin changed his position and opposed continuation of the NEP. Part of the reason for his change was that the peasants in the years before 1928 started hoarding grain in response to low domestic and international prices for their produce.

Stalin implemented agricultural collectivization, which would end private ownership of land. The state would take land from its previous owners and place it either under collective ownership of peasants (kolkhoz) or under state ownership (sovkhoz). The idea behind collectivization was that large estates tend to yield more agricultural output. Also, owners of a large farm tended to be better able to afford machinery such as tractors and threshers than owners of small plots of land, and these technological implements would increase worker productivity, freeing up peasants to move to the cities and construction sites to aid the industrialization process. Before collectivization, the owners of large farms tended to be wealthy peasants (kulaks) but the Bolsheviks regarded the kulaks as capitalist exploiters, and wished to redistribute the surplus land to the poorer peasants. The only way to have large farms without kulak owners was to form collective farms.

The Soviet state needed increased agricultural output to feed the workers in the cities and construction sites. The end of the NEP meant that peasants would no longer be able to sell grain to the state. Thus, the state would have to requisition surplus grain.

Collectivization met with little success before 1934 in terms of agricultural output. The Soviet state was slow to provide the necessary tractors and other machinery to the collective farms and this delay caused a reduction in agricultural output. Kulaks also resisted the collectivization process by slaughtering their livestock and hiding harvested grain in protest, reducing output even more. On top of these two conditions, the state was requisitioning more grain than the quantity produced. These three factors coupled with a severe drought and a slow response from the soviet administration led to a famine in parts of the countryside in 1932–33 including Kazakhstan, Ukraine and southern Russia. The famine and drought were so severe in the region that it also affected other countries such as Romania. In Ukraine, at least four million peasants died.

Industrialization 
While collectivization did not meet with much success, industrialization during the Great Break did. Stalin announced his first Five-Year-Plan for industrialization in 1928. The goals of his plan were unrealistic – for example, he wished to increase worker productivity by 110 percent. Yet even though the country was not able to meet these overambitious goals, it still did increase output to an impressive extent.

Industrialization involved expanding the numbers of factories and construction projects such as dams, railways, and canals. Examples of well-publicized construction projects at the time are the completion in June 1930 of a huge tractor factory at Stalingrad and a hydroelectric power station on the Dnepr River. The Soviets also built a city based around metallurgical processing, called Magnitogorsk.

The increased number of projects meant an increased demand for workers, and as a result the Soviet state did not experience any unemployment during the Great Break.

Cultural Revolution 
The third aspect of the Great Break was the Cultural Revolution, which touched Soviet social life in three main ways.

First, the Cultural Revolution created a need for scientists to demonstrate their support to the regime. During the NEP years, the Bolsheviks tolerated “bourgeois specialists” such as medical doctors and engineers, who tended to come from wealthier backgrounds from pre-revolutionary years, because they needed these specialists for their skilled labour. However, a new generation of Soviet children educated in Soviet ideology would soon be ready to replace the bourgeois specialists. These technically educated students would later be called “Red specialists.” The regime saw these students as more loyal to Communism and as a result more desirable than the old bourgeois remnants. Because the state would no longer need to rely so heavily on the bourgeois specialists, after 1929, the regime increasingly demanded that scientists, engineers, and other specialists prove their loyalty to Bolshevik and Marxist ideology. If these specialists did not conform to the new demands for loyalty, they could be accused of counterrevolutionary wrecking and face arrest and exile, as with the engineers accused in the Shakhty Trial.

The Cultural Revolution also affected religious life. The Soviet regime regarded religion as a form of “false consciousness” and wanted to reduce the masses' dependence on religion. The Soviet regime transformed previously religious holidays such as Christmas into their own, Soviet-style holidays.

Finally, the cultural revolution changed the educational system. The state needed more engineers, especially “Red” engineers to replace the bourgeois ones. As a result, the Bolsheviks made higher education free – many members of the working class would not otherwise be able to afford such education. The educational institutions also admitted individuals who were not sufficiently prepared for higher education. Many had not finished their secondary education, either because they could not afford it or because they did not need one to get an unskilled job. Furthermore, the institutions tried to train engineers in a shorter amount of time. These factors combined led to the training of more scientists and engineers, but of lower quality.

References

Ideology of the Communist Party of the Soviet Union
Stalinism
Economic history of the Soviet Union
Politics of the Soviet Union
1928 in the Soviet Union
1929 in the Soviet Union